The Cleveland International Women are an American women’s soccer team, founded in 2004. The team is a member of the Women's League Soccer (WLS), a new and alternative women’s soccer league in the United States that uses an open league model of promotion and relegation to compete globally.

Home games are played in Pinnacle Sports Complex stadium in Medina, Ohio, 35 miles south of Cleveland. The team's colors are red, white and blue.

The team is a sister organization of the men's Cleveland Internationals team, which plays in the USL Premier Development League.

Players

Current roster

Notable former players
  Danesha Adams
  Amanda Cinalli

Year-by-year

Average attendance

External links
Internationals Soccer

Women's soccer clubs in the United States
USL W-League (1995–2015) teams
Cleveland Internationals
2004 establishments in Ohio
Association football clubs established in 2004
Women's sports in Ohio